Eoghan McSweeney (born 1997) is an Irish Gaelic footballer. At club he plays with Knocknagree and at inter-county level with the Cork senior football team. He usually lines out as a forward.

Honours

Knocknagree
Cork Premier Intermediate Football Championship: 2020
Cork Intermediate Football Championship: 2019
All-Ireland Junior Club Football Championship: 2018
Munster Junior Club Football Championship: 2017
Cork Junior A Football Championship: 2017
Duhallow Junior A Football Championship: 2015, 2016

References

External links
Eoghan McSweeney profile at the Cork GAA website

1997 births
Living people
Knocknagree Gaelic footballers
Duhallow Gaelic footballers
Cork inter-county Gaelic footballers